Tešanjka is a village in the municipalities of Usora and Tešanj, Bosnia and Herzegovina.

Demographics 
According to the 2013 census, its population was 960, with 429 living in the Tešanj part and 531 living in the Usora part.

References

Populated places in Tešanj
Populated places in Usora